Silvertip may refer to:

Silvertip bear, a name sometimes used to refer to the grizzly bear
The Everett Silvertips, a WHL hockey team named for the bear
Silvertip badger, a grade of badger hair used in a shave brush
Silvertip fir, a type of evergreen tree (Abies magnifica) often used as a Christmas tree
Silvertip shark, a large and slender shark (Carcharhinus albimarginatus) found at or close to offshore remote island reefs
Silvertip tetra, a small freshwater fish (Hasemania nana) found in Brazil
Silvertip Peak, a summit in Washington
Silvertip Peak (Wyoming), a summit in Wyoming